KCCI's Alleman tower is a 660.6 m (2165 ft) tall guyed television tower standing near Alleman, Iowa, USA at 41°48'35.0" N and 93°37'17.0" W. The tower was built in 1974 and is used to transmit KCCI's digital signal. In the vicinity are towers used by the other Des Moines-area television stations as well as several FM radio stations. KCCI is a subsidiary of Hearst Television, a division of the Hearst Corporation.

See also
 List of masts, Table of masts
 Tallest structures in the U.S.
 List of the world's tallest structures

External links
 
 
 http://www.skyscraperpage.com/diagrams/?b7113
 http://msrmaps.com/GetImageArea.ashx?t=1&s=11&lon=-93.621388&lat=41.809722&w=600&h=400&b=2&bc=ff000000&g=2&gc=80ff0000&f=&fs=12&fc=ffffffff&logo=1&lp=---

Buildings and structures in Polk County, Iowa
Towers in Iowa
Radio masts and towers in the United States
Towers completed in 1974
1974 establishments in Iowa